152830 Dinkinesh (provisional designation ) is a small, stony main-belt asteroid  in diameter. It was discovered by the Lincoln Near-Earth Asteroid Research (LINEAR) survey at Socorro, New Mexico on 4 November 1999. This asteroid was identified as a flyby target for NASA's Lucy mission in January 2023, which will approach  from the asteroid on 1 November 2023. Dinkinesh will be Lucys first and smallest flyby target and it will become the smallest main-belt asteroid visited by a spacecraft yet. It was identified as a target by Raphael Marschall, mission collaborator of the Nice Observatory, after Lucy had launched. The asteroid does not exhibit a detectable light curve, suggesting it could either be roughly spheroidal, rotating pole-on, or rotating very slowly.

Name 
Dinkinesh is the Ethiopian name for the Lucy fossil, after which the Lucy mission is named. The name means "you are marvelous" in the Amharic language. The name was proposed by the Lucy mission team after the asteroid was identified as a flyby target, and it was later approved and announced by the International Astronomical Union's Working Group for Small Bodies Nomenclature on 6 February 2023.

References

External links 
 
 

Main-belt asteroids
Discoveries by LINEAR
Dinkinesh
Minor planets to be visited by spacecraft
19991104